Hoquiam is a city in Grays Harbor County, Washington, United States. It borders the city of Aberdeen at Myrtle Street, with Hoquiam to the west. The two cities share a common economic history in lumbering and exporting, but Hoquiam has maintained its independent identity. It shares a long rivalry with its more populated neighbor, especially in high school sports.

Hoquiam (Ho'-kwee-um, or Ho-kwim, to natives) was incorporated on May 21, 1890. Its name comes from a Native-American word meaning "hungry for wood",  from the great amount of driftwood at the mouth of the Hoquiam River. The population was 8,776 at the 2020 census.

History
One of the first logging operations in Hoquiam was established by Ed Campbell in 1872.

About 10 years later, Captain Asa M. Simpson, a Pacific Coast mariner and businessman in the lumber industry from San Francisco, provided the financing for the Northwestern Mill. In 1881, Simpson sent his manager, George Emerson, to Hoquiam to establish a mill there, and Emerson purchased 300 acres for the new mill and lumber operation. By September 1882, the Simpson mill was producing its first lumber products.

In 1886, Captain Simpson merged his mill with the Miller Brothers mill, also located in Hoquiam, and named it the Northwest Lumber Company The mill was later renamed the Simpson Lumber Company, and retained that name until 1906. In 1913, Frank J. Shields became the new manager at the mill at Hoquiam.

The extension of the railroad from Aberdeen to Hoquiam, beginning in 1898, contributed to the continued importance of logging and lumber in Hoquiam. The importance of logging and related products continued to be relevant to Hoquiam's economy, and in 1927, a pulp mill was established under the name of Grays Harbor Pulp Company. A year later, a Pennsylvania company- the Hammermill Paper Company- became interested in Grays Harbor Pulp Company. When the Pennsylvania company bought stock in the Grays Harbor Pulp Company, the Grays Harbor pulp Company built a paper mill and became the Grays Harbor Pulp & Paper Company. In 1936, the Grays Harbor Pulp and Paper Company merged with Rayonier Incorporated, a company which manufactured a certain kind of wood pulp used by its customers to produce rayon.

In 1907, Hoquiam was home to Industrial Workers of the World Industrial Union No. 276.

Geography

Climate
Hoquiam experiences a Mediterranean climate (Köppen climate classification Csb) that borders closely on an oceanic climate.

Demographics

2010 census
As of the census of 2010, there were 8,726 people, 3,480 households, and 2,119 families residing in the city. The racial makeup of the city was 85.5% White, 0.8% African American, 3.9% Native American, 1.1% Asian, 0.2% Pacific Islander, 4.2% from other races, and 4.2% from two or more races. Hispanic or Latino of any race were 9.5% of the population.

There were 3,480 households, of which 32.3% had children under the age of 18 living with them, 37.5% were married couples living together, 16.5% had a female householder with no husband present, 6.8% had a male householder with no wife present, and 39.1% were non-families. 30.7% of all households were made up of individuals, and 13.6% had someone living alone who was 65 years of age or older. The average household size was 2.48 and the average family size was 3.03.

The median age in the city was 37.6 years. 24.2% of residents were under the age of 18; 10.2% were between the ages of 18 and 24; 24.5% were from 25 to 44; 26.1% were from 45 to 64; and 15% were 65 years of age or older. The gender makeup of the city was 48.9% male and 51.1% female.

2000 census
As of the census of 2000, there were 9,097 people, 3,640 households, and 2,245 families residing in the city.  The population density was 992 people per square mile (383/km2).  There were 4,023 housing units, with an average density of 438.7 per square mile (169.4/km2).  The racial distribution of the city was 89.32% White, 5.75% Latino, 3.86% Native American, 1.18% Asian, 0.32% African-American, 0.07% Pacific Islander, 2.09% from other races, and 3.18% from two or more races. The white population breaks down as 14.6% American, 13.8% German, 9.6% Irish, 6.8% English and 5.7% Norwegian ancestry.

There were 3,640 households, of which 31.8% had children under the age of 18 living with them, 41.8% were married couples living together, 14.7% had a female head of house with no husband present, and 38.3% were non-families. 31.6% of all households were made up of individuals, and 15.4% had someone living alone who was 65 years of age or older. The average household size was 2.47 persons and the average family size was 3.09 members.

The population was aligned with 27.4% under the age of 18, 8.6% from 18 to 24, 26.6% from 25 to 44, 22.0% from 45 to 64, and 15.3% who were 65 years of age or older.  The median age was 36 years.  For every 100 females, there were 94.7 males.  For every 100 females age 18 and over, there were 89.3 males.

The median household income was $29,658 and the median family income was $34,859. The median male income was $33,417 versus $23,558 for females. The per capita income for the city was $15,089, with 19.0% of the population and 16.1% of families living below the poverty line.  Of the total population, 26.5% of those under the age of 18 and 8.9% of those 65 and older were living below the poverty line.

Arts and culture

Annual events
Hoquiam is the home of the Logger's Playday, celebrated with a parade and logging competition every September, in which loggers from around the world come to participate.

Hoquiam sponsors the Shorebird Festival, the Logger's Playday, the Hoquiam's Riverfest, and the On Track Arts Festival.

Sports
The main sports team in the town is the Hoquiam High School Grizzlies, the Crimson and Gray.  In 2004, the boys basketball team completed a perfect 28–0 season and won the state 2A championship.  Victories included non-league wins over Lincoln High of Tacoma, Bellevue High, two over archrival Aberdeen High, and a win over a touring team from Australia.  It was the only game the Australians lost during their tour.

In 2006, the Washington Interscholastic Activities Association (WIAA) changed the enrollment limit for the 2A classification allowing Aberdeen to drop to 2A along with other schools in the area creating a new league.  The old league football rivalry which celebrated its 100th anniversary in 2006 was renewed with the 101st meeting between Hoquiam and Aberdeen on October 14.  Hoquiam Grizzlies won 20–6. Although Aberdeen holds the overall record at 67-33-5 as of the 2010 season.

Hoquiam and Aberdeen High Schools also compete against each other in an annual Fall food drive, referred to as the "Food Ball" and dedicated to helping local low-income families. In this competition everyone wins regardless of which school collects the most food donations.

Since 1981, Hoquiam High School has hosted the largest distance running event on the Washington coast. The Hoquiam Grizzly Alumni Cross Country Invitational features 35+ schools and 1,000+ high school runners every October. Hoquiam also sponsors the Grizzly Alumni Wrestling tournament in January and Volleyball tournament in September.

The city was also home of the Western Baseball League's Grays Harbor Gulls from 1995 to 1997. They played their home games at Olympic Stadium listed on the National Register of Historic Places. The city is now home of the Grays Harbor Bearcats, a developmental football team of the North American Football League (NAFL). Historically, the city has been home to several Minor League Baseball teams including the Hoquiam Loggers and the Grays Harbor Ports.

Infrastructure
The local airport, Bowerman Airport , is coastal Washington's only jet-capable airport. It has a 5,000-foot (1,524 m) runway and a parallel taxiway located on a narrow peninsula extending westward into Grays Harbor.  Hoquiam is also home to dozens of species of migratory birds that nest along the water's edge during the milder months.

Notable people
 Anton Anderson – chief engineer of Alaska Railroad; Mayor of Anchorage; worked as a surveyor in Hoquiam.
 Thomas J. Autzen – pioneer in plywood manufacturing.
 Eldon Bargewell – U.S. Army general; commander of Delta Force.
 William Boeing  – Aviator who founded the Boeing company.
 Robert Cantwell – novelist and critic; lived in Hoquiam.
 Harris Ellsworth – U.S. Congressman from Oregon.
 Jack Elway – football player and coach.
 Ed Gayda, basketball player for Washington State University, where he was 1st-team All-PCC in 1949 and 1950. He was drafted by the Tri-Cities Blackhawks in the 2nd round (15th overall pick) in the 1950 NBA draft and played with the Blackhawks during the 1950-1951 season. He was inducted into the Pac-12 Hall of Honor in 2014.
 George H. Hitchings – co-recipient of 1988 Nobel Prize in Physiology or Medicine.
 Lynn Kessler – eight-term member of Washington State House of Representatives; lives in Hoquiam.
 Albert Kuhn – pioneer and businessman.
 Ida Soule Kuhn – pioneer and activist.
 Walt Morey – author.
 Howard P. Robertson – mathematician and physicist known for contributions to physical cosmology and the uncertainty principle.
 Martin F. Smith – U.S. Representative from Washington; practiced law in Hoquiam.

Further reading
  From the book "thirty years ago ... Destructive Development began ... greed for wealth ... denuded acres ... logged-off land ... found to be fertile ... capable of the highest state of cultivation ... fishing profit  ... splendid landlocked body of water ... fir ... perfect lumber ... lumber and shingle mills ... Clams, crabs and shrimp ... abundant ... an agreeable climate ... dairy industry ... unbounded ... few soils are superior to those here ... unlimited opportunity ... berry orchards ... poultry leading place ..."

References

External links

Official city website

Northwestern Lumber Company Photos, 1900-1935 Collection includes photos of logging operations in and around Hoquiam, Wa.

Cities in Washington (state)
Cities in Grays Harbor County, Washington
Populated places established in 1890
Populated coastal places in Washington (state)
Washington placenames of Native American origin